The Dai Nihon Shiryo (大日本史料) is a collection of historical documents from the ninth to the seventeenth century, published by Historiographical Institute of the University of Tokyo in 1901, and is still being published. It consists of 343 volumes, with an index in 17 volumes published between 1923 and 1963.

External links
『大日本史料』の手引き
大日本史料

Series of history books
Book series introduced in 1901